Denunciation is the action of reporting a person to authorities.

Denunciation may also refer to:
 Denunciation (international law), in the context of a treaty, denunciation or abrogation is the announcement of its termination.
 Denunciation (penology), in sentencing philosophy the disapproval of an act by society that is expressed by the imposition of a sentence